Heimeshoff v. Hartford Life & Accident Ins. Co., 571 U.S. 99 (2013), is a United States Supreme Court case.  In this case, the court considered whether the agreed-upon limitations period for filing a legal objection to long-term disability denial began when the claim was filed or the claim received a final denial. In a unanimous decision, the court ruled the agreed-upon limitations period is neither too short nor is there a statute that prevents it from taking effect, as such the courts are bound to enforce the limitations period and its start date as written in the coverage plan.

References

External links
 

2013 in United States case law
United States contract case law
United States Supreme Court cases of the Roberts Court
United States Supreme Court cases